Harold Gladstone Miller (15 May 1898–4 March 1989) was a notable New Zealand lecturer, librarian and writer. He was born in Masterton, New Zealand, on 15 May 1898.

References

1898 births
1989 deaths
New Zealand academics
People from Masterton
New Zealand librarians